A narrator is a person who tells a story to the audience.

Narrator may also refer to:

 Unreliable narrator, a narrator whose credibility is compromised
 The Narrator (Fight Club), the narrator of the 1996 novel Fight Club, its 1999 film adaption of the same name, and the comic books Fight Club 2 and Fight Club 3
 The Narrator (Pushing Daisies), the narrator of the ABC television series, Pushing Daisies
 Narrator (song), a song by British band, Squid
 Narrator (Windows), a screen reader in Microsoft Windows